Waldemar Świrydowicz (born 18 December 1986) is a Polish volleyball player.

Career

Clubs
He came back to PlusLiga in 2014, when he signed one-year contract with AZS Politechnika Warszawska. He extended contract in 2016.

References

External links
 PlusLiga player profile

1986 births
Living people
People from Suwałki
Sportspeople from Podlaskie Voivodeship
Polish men's volleyball players
Trefl Gdańsk players
Projekt Warsaw players